Gibson is a city in Keokuk County, Iowa, United States. The population was 63 at the time of the 2020 census.

Geography
Gibson is located at  (41.480571, -92.393031).

Demographics

2010 census
As of the census of 2010, there were 61 people, 28 households, and 18 families living in the city. The racial makeup of the city was 98.4% White and 1.6% Asian.

There were 28 households, of which 35.7% had children under the age of 18 living with them, 46.4% were married couples living together, 17.9% had a female householder with no husband present, and 35.7% were non-families. 32.1% of all households were made up of individuals, and 14.3% had someone living alone who was 65 years of age or older. The average household size was 2.18 and the average family size was 2.72.

The median age in the city was 41.5 years. 24.6% of residents were under the age of 18; 8.2% were between the ages of 18 and 24; 21.4% were from 25 to 44; 27.8% were from 45 to 64; and 18% were 65 years of age or older. The gender makeup of the city was 47.5% male and 52.5% female.

2000 census
As of the census of 2000, there were 92 people, 38 households, and 19 families living in the city. The racial makeup of the city was 100.00% White.

There were 38 households, out of which 36.8% had children under the age of 18 living with them, 44.7% were married couples living together, 5.3% had a female householder with no husband present, and 47.4% were non-families. 44.7% of all households were made up of individuals, and 23.7% had someone living alone who was 65 years of age or older. The average household size was 2.42 and the average family size was 3.60.

In the city, the population was spread out, with 33.7% under the age of 18, 9.8% from 18 to 24, 31.5% from 25 to 44, 6.5% from 45 to 64, and 18.5% who were 65 years of age or older. The median age was 32 years. For every 100 females, there were 91.7 males. For every 100 females age 18 and over, there were 96.8 males.

The median income for a household in the city was $39,375, and the median income for a family was $45,625. Males had a median income of $21,094 versus $27,917 for females. The per capita income for the city was $12,881. There were 9.5% of families and 6.7% of the population living below the poverty line, including 7.5% of under eighteens and none of those over 64.

Education
The Tri-County Community School District operates local area public schools.

References

Cities in Iowa
Cities in Keokuk County, Iowa